The Ramdasia  were historically a Sikh, Hindu  sub-group that originated from the  caste of leather tanners and shoemakers known as Chamar

Terminology
Ramdasia is a term used in general for Sikhs whose ancestors belonged  to Chamar caste. Originally they are followers of Guru Ravidass who belongs to Chamar community. Both the words Ramdasia and Ravidasia are also used inter changeably while these also have regional context. In Puadh and Malwa, largely Ramdasia in used while Ravidasia is predominantly used in Doaba.

 

Ramdasia Sikhs are enlisted as scheduled caste by Department of Social justice, Empowerment and Minorities- Government of Punjab. On Department's list of Scheduled Caste, this caste is listed on serial number 9 along with other Chamar caste synonymous such as Ravidasia, Jatav and so on.

Military service

British Raj

During World War I the single-battalion regiments of the Mazhabi and Ramdasia Sikh Pioneers – the 23rd, 32nd and 34th Pioneer Regiments – were expanded to comprise three battalions each. These units served in Egypt, Europe, Mesopotamia and Palestine and performed well. The 1/34th Sikh Pioneers were awarded the title of "Royal".

The Ramdasia Sikhs, together with the Majhabi Sikhs, were recruited to the Sikh Light Infantry regiment (SLI) after its formation in 1941. The Sikh Light Infantry has always been a "single class" regiment in the parlance adopted from the British Raj era. This means that it recruits only from one demographic, which in this instance means the Ramdasia Sikhs and Mazhabi Sikhs. Indeed, the SLI was initially called the Mazhabi & Ramdasia Sikh Regiment. Despite unwillingness among some policy makers, the British had to abandon their traditional distinction between martial and non-martial races during the Second World War. This was necessitated by the need for more recruits than could be supplied by those communities upon which they usually relied, such as the Jat Sikhs, Dogras and Punjabi Musalmans. In addition, indiscipline among Jat Sikhs caused by their concerns regarding a post-war division of India was another reason to prefer recruitment of new classes. While recruitment from the pre-war martial classes was still pre-eminent, that from newly recognised classes such as the Ramdasias and Mazhabis became significant.

After independence of India
When India became independent in 1947, the British Indian Army became the Indian Army. This, like its predecessor, relies on the martial race theory for much of its recruitment and thus there is a grossly disproportionate number of Sikhs within its ranks. The Ramdasias Sikhs and Mazhabi Sikhs continued their service with the SLI in the new army. The SLI has served in almost all of the post-1947 conflicts involving India, including the wars with Pakistan in 1947, 1965 and 1971, the Hyderabad Police Action of 1948 and the Chinese aggression in 1962. It has also served in Sri Lanka, where the 1st, 7th, 13th and 14th Battalions have contributed towards peace-keeping.

Hindu Ramdasia
This sect of Ramdasia having faith in Hinduism and they mostly residing in Pathankot, Jammu, Himachal Pradesh and Jalandhar. Hindu Ramdasia migrated from Pakistan and back in Sialkot, these Ramdasia were involved in Leather/Sports Goods Business. After migrating in Jalandhar they established their own Tanneries and Sports Goods manufacturing Units. For This purpose Government of Punjab, India helped them by providing liberal loans and allotting sites for their Factories Hindu Ramdasia's are staunch follower of Guru Ravidass and they follow Dera Swami Gurdeep Giri ji, Pathankot. According to Department of Social Justice and Empowerment, Government of India Ramdasias are listed as Chamar Caste on serial number 4 and 14 for Jammu and Kashmir and Himachal Pradesh respectively.

Ramdasia Religious faith
Ramdasia community having faith in  Guru Ravidas and they have established several shrines dedicate to him. In India first recognized shrine was constructed in Kolkata and outside India first shrine was established on Fiji island in 1939 in Nasinu. In Nasinu first Sikh Gurdwara dedicated to Guru Ravidas was constructed by migrants from Doaba region of Punjab.

Demographics

 Census, there were 3,095,324 Chamars in the Indian state of Punjab, of whom 1,017,192 declared themselves as Ad-Dharmi Chamar and 2,078,132 declared themselves as Ramdasia/Ravidasia Chamar. According to this Census, during the same year the population of Sikh Ramdasia/Ravidasia and Hindu Ramdasia/Ravidasia in Punjab was 1,443,079 and 629,157 respectively.

Most of the Hindu Ramdasias (Counted along with other Chamar Caste Synonyms such as Ravidasia and Jatav) living in the Jammu and Kashmir, Himachal Pradesh and Haryana. , there were 212,032 Ramdasia in Jammu and Kashmir, comprising 209,512 Hindus, 2,486 Sikhs and 34 Buddhists, 2,429,137 lived in Haryana (2,390,403 Hindu, 37,191 Sikh and 1,543 Buddhists) and 458,838 resided in Himachal Pradesh (453,871 Hindu, 4,887 Sikh and 80 Buddhists)

Ramdasia Diaspora and Guru Ravidass Temples and Gurdwaras

Ramdasia Sikh diaspora alongside Ravidassia from doaba emigrated from India and Pakistan is significant. Emigration from the Punjab began before and after the 19th century, with many Ravidasia/Ramdasia Sikhs settling in Europe, and also a large Ravidasia/Ramdasia Sikhs population in North America mainly in United States and the Canada. There is sizeable population of Ravidasia/Ramdasia Sikhs in Oceania as well.

Today they have presence in every major city of world where they have also established Guru Ravidass Gurdwaras and Sikh Temples.

Fiji
Guru Ravidass Gurdwara (Nasinu Sikh Temple), Nasinu (Established in 1939)

New Zealand
Guru Ravidass Sikh Temple, Bombay Hills, Auckland (Established in 1991)
Guru Ravidas Temple, Hastings (Established in 2007)
Gurdwara Begampura Sikh Temple, Papakura (Established in 2008)

Australia
Guru Ravidas Gurdwara, Campbellfield, Melbourne (Established in 1996)

England
Shri Guru Ravidas Bhavan, Birmingham 
Shri Guru Ravidass Temple, Southall 
Shri Guru Ravidass Community Centre, Handsworth 
Shri Guru Ravidass Temple, Wolverhampton 
Shri Guru Ravidass Community Centre, Wolverhampton
Shri Guru Ravidas Temple - Coventry 
Shri Guru Ravidass Community Centre, Coventry
Shri Guru Ravidass Temple, Hockley
Shri Guru Ravidas Temple - Foleshill
Shri Guru Ravidass Temple, Bradford 
Shri Guru Ravidass Gurdwara - Bedford 
Shri Guru Ravidass Temple - Darlaston 
Guru Ravidass Sabha Community Centre, Derby
Shri Guru Ravidass Sikh Temple - Derby 
Shri Guru Ravidass Sikh Temple, Leicester 
Shri Guru Ravidass Temple - Willenhall
Shri Guru Ravidass Temple - Walsall 
Shri Guru Ravidass Gurdwara - Erith Kent
Shri Guru Ravidass Mission Temple, London
Shri Guru Ravidass Gurdwara and Community Centre- Hitchin
Shri Guru Ravidass Gurdwara- Newham, London
Guru Ravidass Sabha, Northampton
Dera Baba Gobind Dass, Guru Ravidass Sabha, Bilston
Shri Guru Ravidass Gurdwara - Gravesend
Shri Guru Ravi Dass Sabha - Letchworth
Shri Guru Ravidass Bhavan - Luton 
Shri Guru Ravidass Gurdwara- Strood, Medway
Shri Guru Ravidass Gurdwara - Southampton
Shri Guru Ravidass Temple, Glasgow

United States of America
Guru Ravidass Sikh Temple, Pittsburg, California
Guru Ravidass Sikh Temple, Fresno
Guru Ravidass Sikh Temple, Rio linda 
Guru Ravidass Sikh Temple, Union City
Guru Ravidass Sikh Temple, Yuba City
Guru Ravidass Gurdwara, Selma
Guru Ravidass Sikh Temple, Houston
Guru Ravidass Sikh Temple, New York
Guru Ravidass Sabha, DFW, Texas

Canada
Guru Ravidass Gurdwara, Burlington 
Guru Ravidass Sabha, Brampton
Guru Ravidas Temple, Etobicoke,Toronto (Not in operation anymore and 40 acre land has been purchased by this shrine for the construction of new building in Caledon)
Guru Ravidass Sikh Temple,Montreal 
Guru Ravidass Sabha, Edmonton
Guru Ravidass Sikh Temple, Vancouver
Guru Ravidass Gurdwara and Community Centre, Calgary

Greece
Shri Guru Ravidas Darbar, Koropi, Athens

Italy
Shri Guru Ravidass Dham, Bergamo
Shri Guru Ravidass Temple, Verona
Shri Guru Ravidass Gurdwara, Gorlago
Shri Guru Ravidass Temple, Vicenza
Guru Ravidass Temple, Sabaudia
Shri Guru Ravidass Temple, Manerbio
Shri Guru Ravidass Darbar, Velletri
Shri Guru Ravidas Darbar, Mantova
Shri Guru Ravidass Bhavan , Treviso
Shri Guru Ravidass Temple, Brescia
 Shri Guru Ravidass Dharam Asthan, Reggio Emilia
Shri Guru Ravidass Temple, Montevrchi Arrizo
 Shri Guru Ravidass Temple, Capaccio Salerno

Germany
Guru Ravidass Temple, Frankfurt

Austria
Guru Ravidass Temple,Vienna

Holland
Guru Ravidass Sikh Temple,Den Haag
Guru Ravidass Temple,Amsterdam

Spain
Guru Ravidass Temple, Barcelona
Guru Ravidass Dham, Girona

Belgium
Guru Ravidass Sikh Temple,Oostende

France
Guru Ravidass Gurdwara, Paris
Guru Ravidass Temple, Le blanc Mesnil

See also

 Ravidasia
 Chamar
 Sikh Light Infantry
 Jatav
 Sikhism
 Ad-Dharmi
 Ahirwar
 Chambhar

References

Sikh communities
Social groups of Punjab, India